The 185th Massachusetts General Court, consisting of the Massachusetts Senate and the Massachusetts House of Representatives, met in 2007 and 2008 during the governorship of Deval Patrick.  Therese Murray served as president of the Senate and Salvatore DiMasi served as speaker of the House.

Notable activities included new webcasting of Senate formal sessions and repeal of "a 1913 law declaring that nonresidents could not marry in Massachusetts if the marriage would not be legal in their home states."

Senators

Representatives

See also
 2006 Massachusetts Senate election
 2006 Massachusetts House of Representatives election
 List of Massachusetts General Courts
 110th United States Congress

References

Further reading

External links
 
 
 
 

Political history of Massachusetts
Massachusetts legislative sessions
massachusetts
2007 in Massachusetts
massachusetts
2008 in Massachusetts